Giedrius Barevičius (born 9 August 1976) is a Lithuanian footballer, who played for FK Žalgiris Vilnius and FBK Kaunas.

External links
 

1976 births
Living people
Lithuanian footballers
Lithuania international footballers
Association football midfielders
FK Žalgiris players
FBK Kaunas footballers
FK Panerys Vilnius players
Place of birth missing (living people)